81-740/741 (Rusich), is a type of rolling stock specially designed for running under the harsh winter climate of outdoor Moscow. Rusich also features a corridor connection, allowing passenger access between the two sections of the cars. It was first designed for use on proposed light metro lines such as the Butovskaya line in Moscow (which ended up being the only light metro line built), being similar in nature to some high floor 2-segment articulated trams like the rolling stock of the Los Angeles Metro Rail, the Tyne and Wear Metro, and Docklands Light Railway rolling stock in London.

They are currently assigned to the metro lines including Sokolnicheskaya, Arbatsko-Pokrovskaya, Koltsevaya and Butovskaya lines of Moscow Metro, Kazan Metro and lines M1, M2 and M4 of the Sofia Metro in Bulgaria.

Four main types of Rusich rolling stock were manufactured. 81-740/741, 81-740.1/741.1; 81-740.4/741.4 which are used on the Moscow Metro and in Kazan Metro on the wide Russian gauge, the later having an extra door in the cabless segments. 81-740.2/741.2, 81-740.2B/741.2B is technically adapted and designed for Sofia Metro which uses standard gauge. Besides the 81-717/714 and its derivatives/modifications, it is the only train made by Metrowagonmash to be used outside the former USSR, in the European Union, and to get a modification for a different track gauge.

Its automatic train operation and universal control panel were designed by Tikhomirov Scientific Research Institute of Instrument Design (NIIP).

External links 
 Official page of 81-740/741 Rusich, Metrowagonmash (English version)
  Unofficial site dedicated to Soviet metro wagon

Electric multiple units of Russia
Rolling stock of Bulgaria